The Cấn line (Hán tự: 支艮; chi can also be translated to as branch) was the third dynasty of Hùng kings of the Hồng Bàng period of Văn Lang (now Viet Nam). Starting approximately 2524 B.C., the line refers to the rule of Lân Lang and his successors, when the seat of government was moved to what is today Phú Thọ.

History
Lân Lang was born approximately 2570 B.C., and took the regnal name of Hùng Quốc Vương (雄國王) upon becoming Hùng king. The series of all Hùng kings  following Hùng Lân took that same regnal name of Hùng Quốc Vương to rule over Văn Lang until approximately 2253 B.C.

Lân Lang later changed the national appellation from Xích Quỷ to Văn Lang. Since this time the different ethnic minorities of Vietnam were formed. The administrative rule of the Lạc tướng, Bố chính, and Lạc hầu was promulgated.

Around 2500 BC, the Hùng king expanded rice cultivation.

References

Bibliography
Nguyễn Khắc Thuần (2008). Thế thứ các triều vua Việt Nam. Giáo Dục Publisher.

Ancient peoples
Hồng Bàng dynasty
23rd-century BC disestablishments
26th-century BC establishments
3rd millennium BC in Vietnam